The Battery is a neighbourhood within the city of St. John's, Newfoundland and Labrador that sits on the entrance to the harbour, on the slopes of Signal Hill. It is sometimes described as an outport within the city of St. John's and is noted for its steep slopes, and colourful houses. The Battery has been the site, over the centuries, for gun emplacements (batteries), such as Fort Waldegrave, for the defence of St. John's Harbour, including during both World Wars.

Chain Rock 
It is home to Chain Rock, a land outcropping to which a large chain was attached connecting to Fort Amherst, since as early as 1770, to prevent the entry of enemy ships into St John's harbour. Chain Rock is one of two rocks located on opposite sides of the Narrows, the aptly named entrance to the harbour; Pancake Rock is on the opposite shore. The space between the two rocks is 174 metres. A defensive chain was stretched between the rocks by means of a capstan at nightfall. During World War I and II the chain was replaced with anti-submarine nets.

Avalanches & landslides 
Minor landslides have been frequent in the area's past, and a small number of avalanches; there were three avalanches in the twentieth-century involving loss of life or serious injury, two in February 1921, and one February 1959.  

A list of major avalanches includes:

Although no major events have occurred between 1959 and 2020, in 1995 the city of St. John's began studying the area in an attempt to minimize risk associated with rock slides and avalanches. The Canadian Avalanche Association conducted studies in the area; based on their work, the city spent an estimated $300,000 to protect the area from further instability. Despite this a house was badly damaged by an avalanche in January 2020, following a record snowfall and hurricane force winds.

Notables
Frank Maher (musician), button accordionist

See also
Neighbourhoods in St. John's, Newfoundland and Labrador

References

Neighbourhoods in St. John's, Newfoundland and Labrador
World War II sites in Canada
History of St. John's, Newfoundland and Labrador